Bufalin is a cardiotonic steroid toxin originally isolated from Chinese toad venom, which is a component of some traditional Chinese medicines.

Research

Bufalin has in vitro antitumor effects against various malignant cell lines, including hepatocellular and lung carcinoma.  However, as with other bufadienolides, its potential use is hampered by its cardiotoxicity.

References

Bufanolides
Cardiac stimulants
Toxins